Svensson (also Svenson and anglicised Swensson, Swenson, Swinson or Swanson) is the ninth most common
Swedish family name,  there are about 88,000 people with the name in the population register. The name literally means "son of Sven", or "Sven's son", originally a patronymic surname. Sven (in Danish and Norwegian also Svend and in Norwegian also "Svein") is a Nordic first name which is used throughout Scandinavia, Estonia and Germany. The name itself is Old Norse for "Young man" or "Young warrior."

In Swedish, "Svensson" is used to signify an ordinary Swedish person (akin to an average Joe), as in "Han är en riktig svensson" ("He's a typical Svensson"). The term can be derogatory or descriptive. There is a word 'medelsvensson', which describes a typical Swede.

Notable people with the surname include:

People

Music
 Alf Svensson (guitarist) (born 1967), Swedish heavy metal guitarist of At the Gates
 Andreas "Dregen" Tyrone Svensson (born 1973), Swedish guitarist of Backyard Babies
 Barbro Svensson (1938–2018), better known as Lill-Babs, Swedish singer, actress and television presenter
 Daniel Svensson (born 1977), Swedish drummer of the Swedish band In Flames and drummer / vocalist for the band Sacrilege GBG
 Esbjörn Svensson (1964–2008), Swedish jazz pianist and founder of the jazz group Esbjörn Svensson Trio
 Martin Svensson (singer) (born 1978), also known as Martin, Swedish singer, author and musician
 Ola Svensson (born 1986), Swedish singer songwriter, known by the mononym Ola or later on as Brother Leo
 Peter Svensson (born 1974), Swedish record producer, songwriter and musician
 Jan Svensson (born 1950), Swedish pop singer known as Harpo

Politics
 Alf Svensson (politician) (born 1938), Swedish politician
 Eva-Britt Svensson (born 1946), Swedish politician and former Member of the European Parliament
 Per-Olof Svensson
 Valborg Svensson (1903–1983), Swedish politician and journalist

Sports
 Åke Svenson (born 1953), Swedish Olympic middle-distance runner
 Anders Svensson (bandy) (born 1975), Swedish bandy player
 Anders Svensson (canoeist) (born 1977), Swedish canoer
 Anders Svensson (footballer, born 1939) (1939–2007), Swedish footballer
 Anders Svensson (footballer, born 1976), Swedish footballer
 Annica Svensson (born 1983), Swedish female footballer
 Björn Svensson (born 1986), Swedish ice hockey player
 Bo Svensson (born 1979), Danish footballer and coach
 Gustav Svensson (born 1987), Swedish footballer
 Jonas Svensson (tennis) (born 1966), Swedish tennis player
 Karl Svensson (born 1984), Swedish footballer
 Leif Svensson (born 1951), Swedish ice hockey player
 Madelein Svensson (born 1969), Swedish race walker
 Magnus Svensson (footballer) (born 1969), Swedish footballer
 Magnus Svensson (ice hockey, born 1963), Swedish ice hockey player
 Magnus Pääjärvi-Svensson (born 1991), ice hockey player
 Marie Svensson (born 1967), Swedish table tennis player
 Pelle Svensson
 Per Svensson (ice hockey)
 Tommy Svensson (born 1945), football manager and player
 Victoria Sandell Svensson (born 1977), Swedish footballer

Others
 Allan Svensson, Swedish actor, Gustav Svensson in Svensson, Svensson
 Antero Svensson (1892–1946), Finnish Army major general
 Bengt Svensson (born 1958), Swedish Army major general
 Bo Svenson, Swedish–American actor 
 Catharina Svensson,  Danish lawyer, a professional equestrienne, model and beauty queen
 Chris Svensson (1965–2018), British car designer
 Emil Svensson, a fictional character by Astrid Lindgren
 Johan Svensson, Swedish Air Force officer
 Lars E. O. Svensson, Swedish economist
 Lars Svensson (ornithologist), Swedish ornithologist
 Mattias Svensson
 Per Svensson (actor)
 Roland Svensson (1910–2003), Swedish painter and illustrator

Others
 Svensson (company), Swedish fashion retailer, based in Malmö
Svensson, Svensson, a Swedish sitcom

See also
 Swenson (disambiguation)
 Svendsen
Sveinson

References

Swedish-language surnames
Patronymic surnames
Surnames from given names